Galium is a large genus of annual and perennial herbaceous plants in the family Rubiaceae, occurring in the temperate zones of both the Northern and Southern Hemispheres. Some species are informally known as bedstraw.

There are over 600 species of Galium, with estimates of 629 to 650 as of 2013. The field madder, Sherardia arvensis, is a close relative and may be confused with a tiny bedstraw. Asperula is also a closely related genus; some species of Galium (such as woodruff, G. odoratum) are occasionally placed therein.

See also
List of Lepidoptera that feed on Galium
List of Galium species

References

External links

 World Checklist of Rubiaceae

 
Rubiaceae genera
Taxa named by Carl Linnaeus